The Nepal Railway Company Ltd. (in short Nepal Railway), reporting mark: NRW / ने. रे)   is a state-owned company under Department of Railways (DORW) which operates passenger train  services in Nepal. Currently it operates passenger transport service on the  line from Jainagar, India to Kurtha, Nepal.

History

There were three railway lines in Nepal, all narrow gauge  lines:
 Nepal Government Railway (NGR)
 Nepal Janakpur Jaynagar Railway (NJJR)
 Koshi Railway

Nepal Government Railway

The first railway in Nepal was the Nepal Government Railway (NGR), a  narrow gauge railway, built by the British in 1927, during the Rana period. The railway connected Raxaul in British India with Amlekhganj in the Kingdom of Nepal. This  line allowed people from different areas of the country to reach Amlekhganj, and helped move heavy vehicles to Bhimphedi. It was then possible to reach Kathmandu from Bhimphedi on foot. The railway possessed seven steam locomotives, 12 coaches and 82 wagons. It operated steam-powered Garratt locomotives manufactured by Beyer, Peacock & Company of England.

Nepal Janakpur Jaynagar Railway
The second railway in the country was the Nepal Janakpur–Jainagar Railway (NJJR), a  narrow gauge railway, built by the British in 1937, during the Rana period. This  track was built to carry timber from the then heavily forested areas of Janakpur in the Kingdom of Nepal to Jainagar in British India. The railway was later extended to Bijalpura.

Koshi Railway
The Koshi Railway was built in 1957 to carry stones and gravels near from Dharan and Chatara to the new building site of the Koshi Barrage. The rail line was linked with Birpur and Bhimnagar in India. The material and machineries for the Koshi Barrage site used to import from this route from Bathnaha, which was also connected with Jogbani.

The Raxaul–Amlekhganj railway track was operational until 1965. It was closed down after opening of the Tribhuvan Highway. The railway track from Raxaul was converted to  broad gauge by Indian Railways to connect Sirsiya (Birganj) Inland Container Depot (ICD). The railway became fully operational in 2005, though certain segments were used as early as 2002. It is used to move containers and other cargo to and from the Kolkata port and other places in India. It is the most important entry point for imports into China, and is essential for Nepal's commerce and trade.

After a washout of the railway embankment and two bridges, the track between Janakpur and Bijayalpura (22 km railway line) was closed in 2001. The remaining Janakpur–Jainagar railway track was converted to  broad gauge in 2018. The extension to Bardibas remains under construction.

Current Railway Lines

Jaynagar–Bardibas railway

Jaynagar–Bardibas railway line project is being completed in three phases.
Jaynagar–Janakpur–Kurtha line - completed: This  track is already complete and trains are running on the regularly basis.
Kurtha–Bijalpura: This  track is also completed. Tracks has been laid and station buildings has been constructed.
Bijalpura–Bardibas: The final  route section has still not started the construction as the land acquisition by Government of Nepal is not yet complete as of April 2022.

Bathnaha-Biratnagar Railway

Planned & under-construction railway lines

See 8 different India–Nepal cross-border rail lines, some of which are complete and others are either under planning or being constructed.

China–Nepal Railway, planned 72 km line which will link Kathmandu with Shigatse in Tibet, crossing the China–Nepal border at Gyirong–Rasuwa.

Incidents
In August 2012, a serious incident occurred when a locomotive ran away without bogies while a driver was putting in oil. The locomotive ran from Jainagar to Janakpur at speeds far exceeding the restrictions on the line, resulting in the normally two-and-a-half hours journey of  taking only 45 minutes. The staff at Janakpur diverted the locomotive engine onto a damaged track where its wheels became stuck in the ground and it came to a full stop without causing any injuries.

Future
Nepal Railway plans to extend its service beyond Janakpur in future. It is going to operate to Bijayalpura very soon, up to where infrastructures are operational and up to Bardibas in the near future where rail infrastructures are under construction by Department of Railways.

Gallery

See also

 Railway stations in Nepal 
 Transport in Nepal
 Railway stations in India

References

External links 
 Department of Railways in Nepal

5 ft 6 in gauge railways in Nepal
Government agencies of Nepal
Government-owned railway companies
Railway companies established in 1927
 
1927 establishments in Nepal